The Muthoot family is one of the foremost business houses in South India. The family has interests in various sectors of business varying from financial services to media. The founder of the Muthoot Group was Muthoot Ninan Mathai, from whom the business house was later taken over by his son, M. George Muthoot,. The family traces its roots to Thevervelil Family in the small town of Kozhencherry in Central Travancore.

The Muthoot family are Christians belonging to the Malankara Orthodox Syrian Church, and is one of the most influential members among the Christian community in Kerala. M. G. George Muthoot, the third son of M. George Muthoot became the Trustee of the Malankara Orthodox Church in March 2007.

See also
George Alexander Muthoot

References

External links
Muthoot Gold Point

Business families of India
Kerala families
Muthoot Group